Atmaram Makanbhai Parmar is a Bharatiya Janata Party politician from Gujarat. Currently he is MLA from Gadhada Vidhansabha. He was Cabinet Minister of Social Justice and Empowerment (including Welfare of Scheduled Castes, Welfare of Socially and Economically Backward Class), Women and Child Welfare in First Vijay Rupani ministry from 2016 to 2017. He was also State Social Welfare Minister in Narendra Modi Government from 2007 to 2012. He was also Deputy Speaker of Gujarat Vidhansabha from 25 February 2015 to 6 August 2016.

References 

Living people
Bharatiya Janata Party politicians from Gujarat
Gujarat MLAs 2007–2012
Gujarat MLAs 2012–2017
Gujarat MLAs 2017–2022
Year of birth missing (living people)
People from Surat
Deputy Speakers of the Gujarat Legislative Assembly